The Istanbul Metro has two stations with the name Bostancı:

 Bostancı (M4) on the M4 line. 
 Bostancı (M8) on the M8 line.